José del Carmen Lugo (1813 – c. 1870) was a major 19th century Californio landowner in Southern California.

History
He was born in 1813 at the Pueblo de Los Angeles, in Spanish colonial Alta California, then a province of the Viceroyalty of New Spain. José del Carmen Lugo was the eldest son of Antonio Maria Lugo.

Mexican period
José del Carmen Lugo, in a joint venture with his brothers José María and Vicente Lugo and cousin Diego Sepúlveda, began colonizing the San Bernardino Valley and adjacent Yucaipa Valley. Their colony charter was approved by the Mexican government in 1839. The valley was plagued by robberies and frequent raids by California Indians resisting loss of their homeland. Many would-be colonizers would stay for only short periods of time. The Lugo families became strong allies with the Mountain Band of Cahuilla Indians led by Chief Juan Antonio.

In 1842, the Lugo family bought the San Bernardino Asistencia, a former "sub-mission" of Mission San Gabriel. The adobe buildings were in disrepair. Lugo made repairs and soon he and his wife and two daughters moved into the asistencia.

By 1842, the Mexican governorship of California was about to change.

Mexican–American War
During the Mexican–American War, Lugo led a Californio militia. In December 1846, he was ordered to punish a band of Luiseño Indians in retaliation for the Pauma Massacre. His militia forces, together with allied Cahuilla, killed 33–40 Luiseño in the Temecula Massacre to avenge the deaths of 11 Californio lancers. The latter were killed for stealing horses from the Luiseño.

He was the leader of Californio forces during the Battle of Chino and the Temecula Massacre. By January 1847, he was placed in charge of the Chino prisoners by General José María Flores. Lugo escorted the prisoners to the Rancho Santa Ana del Chino and released them.

In March 1847, he met with the American John Charles Fremont in Los Angeles. Fremont requested that Lugo round up as many of Flores's abandoned horses as possible. Lugo rounded up about 60 horses between Los Angeles and San Bernardino.

U.S. period
The United States won the Mexican–American War and annexed California in 1848. In May 1849, U.S. military Governor Richard Barnes Mason appointed Lugo as the first Mexican-Californio mayor of Los Angeles after U.S. control began. He served after American Stephen Clark Foster (1848 – mid 1849), and before Alpheus P. Hodges (mid 1850–1851).

In August 1849 he was elected Justice of the Peace of Los Angeles and served until January 1850.

In 1852, Lugo sold Rancho San Bernardino to Amasa M. Lyman and Charles C. Rich, apostles of the Church of Jesus Christ of Latter-day Saints. Lugo's fortunes changed for the worse in later years. In 1854, he signed a note at five per cent interest per month, compounded monthly, and mortgaged all of his property including his home in Los Angeles. He lost his house and his land in Los Angeles to cover the note.

José del Carmen Lugo died in poverty in 1870.

Other Lugo family members
The Lugos were a prominent early family in California during the periods of Spanish and Mexican rule. They were among the colonists who became known as Californios.  José del Carmen Lugo was the son of Antonio Maria Lugo, who was the son of original immigrant Francisco Salvador Lugo.

Francisco Salvador Lugo
Francisco Salvador Lugo (1740–1805), born in Sinaloa, Mexico, came to Las Californias in 1774. He was a soldier in the province and was stationed in northern California until 1781. Next he was assigned as part of the founding of the Pueblo de Los Angeles. Francisco Lugo was one of the soldiers who escorted the Los Angeles Pobladores (farming families and colonists) in 1781 from northern Mexico into California. His name is listed on the plaque of those present at the founding of Los Angeles on September 4, 1781. Lugo married Juana Maria Martinez y Vianazul. Together they had nine children: Rosa Maria de Lugo (1761–1797), Maria Tomasa Ygnacia Lugo Martinez (1763–1816), Salvador Lugo (1766–1784), Geronimo Teodoro Lugo (1773–?), Jose Ignacio de Lugo (1775–1800), Maria Antonia Isabel Lugo (1776–1855), “Antonio Maria Lugo (1778–1860)”, Juan Maria Alejandro de Lugo (1780–1830),  and Maria Ygnacia de Lugo (1783–1798).

Antonio Maria Lugo
Antonio Maria Lugo (1778–1860) was born at Mission San Antonio de Padua in present-day Jolon, California, the seventh son of Francisco Salvador Lugo. After 17 years of service at the Presidio of Santa Barbara, in 1810 Corporal Lugo received his discharge and settled with his family in the Pueblo de Los Angeles. Antonio Lugo was granted the Spanish concession Rancho San Antonio in 1810, which was confirmed in 1838 by Mexican governor Juan Alvarado. In 1816, he served as the alcalde (mayor) of Los Angeles. In 1841, Lugo was granted Rancho Santa Ana del Chino by governor Alvarado. On Rancho San Antonio he built Casa de Rancho San Antonio the oldest home in Los Angeles County, California.

Antonio and his wife Dolores Lugo had five sons: José del Carmen (this article), José Maria, Felipe, José Antonio, and Vicente Lugo; and 3 daughters: Vicenta Perez, Maria Antonia Yorba, and María Merced Lugo. Maria married Stephen Clark Foster, the first American mayor of Los Angeles after the Mexican–American War.

See also

 
 History of San Bernardino, California
 
 
 Lugo Adobe (Don Vicente Lugo home)

References

Californios
Land owners from California
People of Mexican California
1813 births
1870s deaths
Year of death missing
Mayors of Los Angeles
Mexican military personnel of the Mexican–American War
People from San Bernardino County, California
People from Yucaipa, California
History of San Bernardino County, California
18th century in Los Angeles
19th century in Los Angeles
19th-century American politicians
19th-century American businesspeople